Medbury School, located in Christchurch, New Zealand, is an independent school for boys between Years 1 to 8 (ages 5 to 13).

History
The school began with only nine boys cared for by the Chennells. By 1925 the number of boys attending the school had grown to approximately 50. In 1955 the Chennells retired; by this time there were 111 boys at the school. Development of facilities has occurred as the school has grown and the school will celebrate 100 years in 2023.

Admission
Boys are accepted into Medbury School at any level between the ages of five and thirteen at the discretion of the Headmaster.

Notable alumni

 Marcus Armstrong - racing driver in the FIA Formula 2 Championship
 Zach Gallagher Crusaders and Canterbury Professional Rugby Player
 Sam Neill actor
 Isaiah Punivai Crusaders and Cantebury Professional Rugby Player
 Ngane Punivai Highlanders and Canterbury Professional Rugby Player
 Teddy Tahu Rhodes - baritone

References

External links
 Official page
 Hands on science

Boys' schools in New Zealand
Educational institutions established in 1923
Primary schools in Christchurch
Boarding schools in New Zealand
1923 establishments in New Zealand